Mechelen-Nekkerspoel is a railway station in the city of Mechelen, Antwerp, Belgium. The station opened on 3 December 1903 on the Lines 25, 27 and 27B.

Train services
The station is served by the following services:

Intercity services (IC-22) Essen - Antwerp - Mechelen - Brussels (weekdays)
Intercity services (IC-22) Antwerp - Mechelen - Brussels - Halle - Braine-le-Comte - Binche (weekends)
Intercity services (IC-31) Antwerp - Mechelen - Brussels (weekdays)
Intercity services (IC-31) Antwerp - Mechelen - Brussels - Nivelles - Charleroi (weekends)
Brussels RER services (S1) Antwerp - Mechelen - Brussels - Waterloo - Nivelles (weekdays)
Brussels RER services (S1) Antwerp - Mechelen - Brussels (weekends)

References

External links
 Mechelen Nekkerspoel railway station at Belgian Railways website

Railway stations opened in 1903
Railway stations in Belgium
Railway stations in Antwerp Province
Buildings and structures in Mechelen